Beilenson is a surname. Notable people with the surname include:

Anthony C. Beilenson (1932–2017), American politician
Edna Beilenson (1909–1981), American typographer, fine press printer, typesetter, book designer, cook book author, and publisher

See also
Beilinson